
Year 462 BC was a year of the pre-Julian Roman calendar. At the time, it was known as the Year of the Consulship of Tricipitinus and Cicurinus (or, less frequently, year 292 Ab urbe condita). The denomination 462 BC for this year has been used since the early medieval period, when the Anno Domini calendar era became the prevalent method in Europe for naming years.

Events 
<onlyinclude>

By place

Greece 
 The Spartans try to conquer the mountain stronghold of Mt Ithome in Messenia, where a large force of rebellious helots have taken refuge. They ask their allies from the Persian Wars, including the Athenians, to help.
 Kimon seeks the support of Athens' citizens providing help to Sparta. Although Ephialtes maintains that Sparta is Athens' rival for power and should be left to fend for itself, Kimon's view prevails. Kimon then leads 4,000 hoplites to Mount Ithome.
 After an attempt to storm Mt. Ithome fails, the Spartans start to distrust the Athenians over concerns that they may take the side of the helots. Retaining their other allies, the Spartans sent Kimon and his men home. This insulting rebuff causes the collapse of Kimon's popularity at Athens. Outrage over the dismissal swings Athenian opinion towards Ephialtes' views.
 Ephialtes passes a law in the Athenian ecclesia, which reforms the Areopagus, limiting its power to judging cases of homicide and religious crimes. He considers the Areopagus to be the centre of conservatism and Ephialtes' victory is seen as a defeat for the conservatives and the members of the oligarchy.
 Argos, taking advantage of Spartan preoccupation with the revolt of its helots, finally conquers Mycenae. The inhabitants of the town are dispersed, with some finding their way into Macedonia.
 Pericles starts to effectively be the leader of Athens.

By topic

Philosophy 
 The Greek philosopher, Anaxagoras, moves to Athens and begins teaching there.

Births

Deaths

References